Miss Wallis and Futuna is a French beauty pageant which selects a representative for the Miss France national competition from the overseas collectivity of Wallis and Futuna. The first Miss Wallis and Futuna was crowned in 2000, although the competition is not organized on a regular schedule and a new titleholder has not been crowned since 2020.

The most recent Miss Wallis and Futuna is Mylène Halemai, who was crowned Miss Wallis and Futuna 2020 on 26 September 2020. No Miss Wallis and Futuna titleholders have gone on to win Miss France.

Results summary
No Miss Wallis and Futuna titleholders have reached the semifinals of Miss France.

Titleholders

Notes

References

External links

Miss France regional pageants
Beauty pageants in France
Women in Wallis and Futuna